L'Association des Scouts du Canada (ASC) is a Canadian Scouting organization. ASC is a World Organization of the Scout Movement "affiliated organization" through affiliation with Scouts Canada. Scouts du Canada primarily serves French speaking Scouting in Canada.

History

The first Canadian Scouting unit was founded in 1908. In 1925, Longueuil teacher Georges-Henri Sainte-Marie started his own unit in the Saint-Antoine de Longueuil parish and decided not to affiliate with the Canadian branch of The Boy Scouts Association of the United Kingdom. The ASC was created in 1961 and in 1975 three new federations were created-Ontario, Atlantic, and West.

In June 1994, the Association des Guides Francophones du Canada (AGFC), the association of French-speaking Guides of Canada, voted against a new protocol from the Girl Guides of Canada which asked for the return to female-only leaders and management, which would have resulted in the loss of approximately 60% of adult members, many of whom were men. In August of the same year the AGFC recommended to its members to join with the ASC and in October it became official. Some members continued as Les Guides franco-canadiennes.

In October 2004 the four federations were dissolved and the 40 districts are now under the direct responsibility of the ASC.

The gold Jerusalem Cross with the fleur-de-lis was the symbol of the ASC, based on the emblem of the Scouts de France which was designed by Father Jacques Sévin SJ, adding a superimposed maple leaf, the most widely recognized national symbol of Canada.

World Events hosted by Association des Scouts du Canada
 14th World Scout Moot: 2013, Awacamenj Mino Camp, Québec

Youth
The Association des Scouts du Canada has eight distinct programs:

Each one of these use a precise program. The number of youth per unit varies from 5 to 30 youth and adults, 1 adult per 5 to 8 youth, depending on their age. There are unisex units as well as mixed units. When a unit is a female only one, they can either use a girls-only program or the boys (mixed gender) one.

The association was built on the Catholic religion, but Canada being a multicultural country, their official stance on religion is left to each individual unit (some units include Muslim members, for example).

Locations

Though the association has units in every province, a large number of members are located in the province of Quebec. At present, the biggest district is located in the city of Montreal.

Neckerchief
No matter which association, in Canada there is only one official set of colours for the neckerchief (for Scouts), which is blue with a yellow border. ASC authorizes units to have their own colors, however, and these are permitted to be worn during everyday types of activities. It is only necessary that members wear the official Scouts Canada neck tie at national and international level events.

Uniforms
The uniforms authorized for ASC members are different than those worn by members of Scouts Canada. Except for Beavers, who wear a yellow T-shirt, all uniforms consist of a colored shirt (the color depends on the branch (age group) of the ASC), beige-khaki pants, a neckerchief, and a leather belt. The color of the shirt is green for 9- to 11-year-olds, blue for 12- to 14-year-olds, red for 15- to 18-year-olds, and pale gray for 18- to 21-year-olds. Scout leaders wear the same color as the youth that they are in charge of. Since both girls and boys wear the same uniform (whether they are in single sex or mixed gender units), the only way to know which program they belong to is by looking at their badges, which are quite different from one another.

Adults
There are three primary functions served by adults in the association. Even as adults, members may progress further and be eligible to receive awards.

Monitors
Monitors are those who have contact with youth members in person. They organize activities following the VCPREF method as suggested by the ASC. Their mission is to assist the youth in developing their physical, spiritual, intellectual, social and affective potential. Such (adult) leaders are eligible for the following awards: Gilwell knot (Noeud de Gilwell), and the Wood Badge (Badge de bois).

Trainers
These adult members are in charge of training and assisting Monitors.

Managers
Managers help monitors by doing administrative tasks such working in areas of the organization such as budget, census, communication, etc.

VCPREF method
The VCPREF method is a project management method that is widely used throughout the Association des Scouts du Canada. It consists of the following six steps (parts):
 Voulu (Wanted)
 Choisi (Chosen)
 Préparé (Prepared)
 Réalisé (Realized)
 Évalué (Evaluated)
 Fêté (Rewarded)

See also
 Guides franco-canadiennes
 Scouting in Québec

Publications
The ASC publishes the following materials for their members:
 Castors en plongée (7- to 8-year-olds), 2000
 L'Itinéraire des Hirondelles (7- to 8-year-old girls), 2000
 Meute en chasse (9- to 11-year-olds), 2002
 Réseau en exploration (9- to 11-year-old girls), 1996
 Parcours d'Éclaireurs (11- to 14-year-olds), 1998
 Le Club des Intrépides (11- to 14-year-old girls), 1996
 Cimes (14- to 17-year-olds), 1995

References

External links
 Official website of the Association des Scouts du Canada (French)

Scouting and Guiding in Canada
Charities based in Canada
World Organization of the Scout Movement member organizations
Youth organizations established in 1961